John Sturdivant (born May 26, 1956) is a former American football defensive linemen who played five seasons with the Winnipeg Blue Bombers of the Canadian Football League. He played college football at the University of Maryland, College Park. He was also a member of the New York Jets, New Jersey Generals and Miami Dolphins.

Professional career
Sturdivant played for a minor league football team in 1981.

New York Jets
Sturdivant signed with the New York Jets in 1982, surviving the team's final preseason cutdown, but was released before the start of the regular season.

New Jersey Generals
Sturdivant was signed by the New Jersey Generals on October 28, 1982. He was released by the Generals on February 28, 1983.

Miami Dolphins
Sturdivant was a member of the Miami Dolphins during the 1983 off-season.

New York Jets
Sturdivant signed with the New York Jets on August 11, 1983. He was released by the Jets on August 29, 1983.

Winnipeg Blue Bombers
Sturdivant played in 41 games for the Winnipeg Blue Bombers from 1983 to 1987.

References

External links
Just Sports Stats

Living people
1956 births
Players of American football from Virginia
American football defensive linemen
Canadian football defensive linemen
American players of Canadian football
Maryland Terrapins football players
Winnipeg Blue Bombers players
Sportspeople from Hampton, Virginia